Neelam Sonkar (born 11 February 1973) is an Indian politician.

She contested Indian general elections 2014 from Lalganj Seat of Uttar Pradesh as Bhartiya Janata Party candidate to enter in 16th Lok Sabha.

She is Post Graduate  M.A. from Gorakhpur University in 1998.

Early life and education

Sonkar was born on February 11, 1973, to Shri Ramchandra and Smt. Bhagyvani Devi. She was born in Kanpur in Uttar Pradesh. Neelam Sonkar has completed her Masters in Arts (MA) from Gorakhpur University.

Positions held
 May, 2014 : Elected to 16th Lok Sabha
 1 Sep. 2014 onwards : Member, Standing Committee on Social Justice and Empowerment.
  April. 2016 onwards : Member, National Level Steering Committee on Standup India Programme.

References 

Politicians from Azamgarh district
India MPs 2014–2019
Lok Sabha members from Uttar Pradesh
Living people
Women in Uttar Pradesh politics
1973 births
Bharatiya Janata Party politicians from Uttar Pradesh
21st-century Indian women politicians
21st-century Indian politicians
People from Gorakhpur